Brent Milligan is an American record producer and session bass guitar player currently residing in Nashville, Tennessee.

Background
Brent Milligan was born in Baton Rouge, Louisiana, and moved to Nashville after graduating from Louisiana State University in 1992. He was a bass player on Big Tent Revival's debut album in 1995. He is the producer and bass player for Steven Curtis Chapman. One of his recent projects is Hills and Valleys (2017), with Tauren Wells as producer, mixer and cello player.

Milligan has produced or performed with a wide range of rock, pop, and gospel artists, including Ceili Rain.

Work

References 

American record producers
Living people
Year of birth missing (living people)